The Communist Party of Canada (Marxist-Leninist) (CPC-ML) fielded 71 candidates in the 2006 federal election.  Some of these candidates have their own biography pages.  Information about others may be found here.

Ontario

Ancaster—Dundas—Flamborough—Aldershot: Jamilé Ghaddar

Ghaddar was born in Lebanon and raised in Montreal and Hamilton.  She is a linguistics graduate from McMaster University in Hamilton, and was twenty-two years old at the time of the 2006 election (Hamilton Spectator, 9 January 2006).  She helped create "Students 4 Steel" in 2004 to build support for the city's steel industry among the McMaster student community (Spectator, 30 March 2004).  She is also a leading member of the McMaster Socialist Movement, Solidarity for Palestinian Human Rights and Citizens Against Racism and Military Aggression 

Ghaddar's first name is sometimes spelled as "Jamila".

Beaches—East York: Roger Carter

Carter was born on June 9, 1941 in Winnipeg, Manitoba.  He joined the CPC-ML in 1975, and has campaigned for the party five times since then.  He is a postal worker, and has been a Canadian Union of Postal Workers shop steward.

Bramalea—Gore—Malton: Francesco (Frank) Chilelli

Chilelli joined the Marxist-Leninist Party in 1996, when he was a graduate student at the University of Toronto.  His thesis, published in 1998, examined liberal and communist concepts of distributive justice.  He was thirty-eight years old in 2006, and was listed as a philosophy teacher for the Peel District School Board. He is a founder of the Bramalea-Gore-Malton Citizens Committee, and a past volunteer with the CARE Connection.  Chilelli has called for Canadian soldiers to be brought home from Afghanistan.

Etobicoke Centre: France Tremblay
France Tremblay (death in 2008) ran for the Marxist-Leninist Party six times, including five federal candidacies and one provincial candidacy in Quebec. In 1993, she described herself as "a party worker involved in the development of mass media." She was also a secretary and homemaker.

In August 2009, the CPC-ML added the name of France Tremblay to its party memorial in Ottawa.

Nickel Belt: Stephen Rutchinski

Rutchinski was raised in Capreol, Ontario, and was 53 years old during the 2004 election.  He is a perennial candidate for the CPC-ML, which he joined in 1973 (Sudbury Star, 10 June 2004).  Formerly a steelworker, shipping supervisor and truck driver, Rutchinski works at the University of Toronto .  He is also a shop steward with United Steelworkers of America Local 1998 (Sudbury Star, 24 June 2004).  He was a member of Toronto's Civil Rights and Privacy Committee during the 1990s, and opposed provisions for biometric identification in the provincial government's Social Assistance Reform Act of 1997.

He has stood for federal and provincial office seven times.  He appeared on the ballot as a non-affiliated candidate in 1980 and as an independent candidate in 1999, in both cases because the CPC-ML was not a registered party.

Rutchinski wrote a piece entitled "Crisis in the Party-Run Parliament Reveals the Necessity for Change" for the CPC-ML's newspaper late 2005, calling for a "new democratic process" to replace Canada's "crisis-ridden party-run Parliamentary democracy".

Oshawa: David Gershuny

Gershuny is a shipper and heavy vehicle operator, and is a perennial candidate for the Marxist-Leninist Party.  During the 1993 election, he announced that his party would bring forward voter recall as part of an electoral reform package (Toronto Star, 22 October 1993).

His brother, Lorne Gershuny, has also been a candidate of the CPC-ML.

St. Catharines: Elaine Couto
Elaine Couto is a perennial candidate. She received 101 votes (0.17%) in 2006, placing sixth against Conservative candidate Rick Dykstra.

Sudbury: David Starbuck

David A. Starbuck is a math teacher at Cambrian College, and a frequent candidate of the CPC-ML.  He has been the Communication Officer of Ontario Public Service Employees Union Local 655, served on the Sudbury District and Labour Council, and been active in groups such as the Sudbury Coalition for Social Justice and the Sudbury Anti-War Mobilization.  Starbuck has campaigned for part-time workers at Ontario community colleges to win the right of collective bargaining.

Toronto—Danforth: Marcell Rodden

Rodden (born 1980) is a political activist in Toronto, Ontario and student in Equity Studies at the University of Toronto.  He is the former general co-ordinator of Young Left, a revolutionary youth group in Toronto founded by former youth members of the Communist Party of Canada who left the party over organizational and political disagreements. Rodden himself was never a member of the Communist Party of Canada, and describes his politics as neo-Maoist.  He is active with Anti-Racist Action in Toronto, the Ontario Coalition Against Poverty, and the Canadian Friends of Soviet People, an organization which supports the re-establishment of the former Soviet Union and publishes the magazine Northstar Compass.  Rodden was a delegate at the Second World Congress of Friends of Soviet People, which was held in Canada.

In 2005, he helped coordinate a campaign by the Ontario Coalition Against Poverty to allow Ontario Works recipients to receive an extra $250 per month in dietary funding from the provincial government. The province tightened its regulations for use of the fund later in the year by changing the legislation.  He was portrayed by actor Dave Healey during the 2006 federal election in an improvisational comedy show called "Mock the Vote".

Trinity—Spadina: S. Nicholas C. (Nick) Lin

Lin is a worker in the healthcare sector, and a frequent candidate for public office.  He has been a member of the Communist Youth Union of Canada (Marxist-Leninist), the Toronto Student Project and the Youth Organizing Movement, as well as the Student Christian Movement of Canada.  Lin has emphasized youth and education issues in his campaigns.   He was 31 years old at the time of the 2003 provincial election.

He has campaigned as an independent candidate in two provincial elections, as the CPC-ML is not registered at the provincial level.

British Columbia

Chilliwack—Fraser Canyon: Dorothy Jean O'Donnell

O'Donnell was a lawyer and a perennial candidate for the CPC-ML who died on February 10, 2021.  She also campaigned provincially in British Columbia, as a candidate of the People's Front.  She wrote a party editorial for the National Post newspaper in 2004, criticizing Canada's election financing laws and denouncing military actions taken by the United States of America in Iraq and by Israel against the Palestinian people.  In the same year, she testified before the British Columbia Citizen's Assembly on Electoral Reform.

O'Donnell graduated from law school in 1990, was called to the bar in 1991, and completed a Master's Degree in 1995 reviewing the history of the foster care system. She was primarily active in family law.

Footnotes